American nationalism is a form of civic, ethnic, cultural or economic influences found in the United States. Essentially, it indicates the aspects that characterize and distinguish the United States as an autonomous political community. The term often explains efforts to reinforce its national identity and self-determination within its national and international affairs.

All four forms of nationalism have found expression throughout the United States' history, depending on the historical period. The first Naturalization Act of 1790 passed by Congress and President George Washington defined American identity and citizenship on racial lines, declaring that only "free white men of good character" could become citizens, and denying citizenship to enslaved Black people and anyone of non-European stock; thus it was a form of ethnic nationalism. American scholars such as Hans Kohn, however, argue that the United States government institutionalized a civic nationalism founded upon legal and rational concepts of citizenship, being based on common language and cultural traditions, and that the Founding Fathers of the United States established the country upon liberal and individualist principles.

History

Colonial
The United States traces its origins to the Thirteen Colonies founded by Britain in the 17th and early 18th century. Residents identified with Britain until the mid-18th century when the first sense of being "American" emerged. The Albany Plan proposed a union between the colonies in 1754. Although unsuccessful, it served as a reference for future discussions of independence.

American Revolution
Soon afterward, the colonies faced several common grievances over acts passed by the British Parliament, including taxation without representation. Americans were in general agreement that only their own colonial legislatures—and not Parliament in London—could pass internal taxes. Parliament vigorously insisted otherwise and no compromise was found. The London government punished Boston for the Boston Tea Party, and the Thirteen Colonies united and formed the Continental Congress, which lasted from 1774 to 1789. Fighting broke out in 1775 and the sentiment swung to independence in early 1776, influenced significantly by the appeal to American nationalism by Thomas Paine. His pamphlet Common Sense was a runaway best seller in 1776, read aloud in taverns and coffee houses. Congress unanimously issued a Declaration of Independence announcing a new nation of independent states had formed, the United States of America. American Patriots won the American Revolutionary War and received generous peace terms from Britain in 1783. The minority of Loyalists (loyal to King George III) could remain or leave, but about 80% remained and became full American citizens. Frequent parades along with new rituals and ceremonies—and a new flag—provided popular occasions for expressing a spirit of American nationalism.

The new nation operated under the very weak national government set up by the Articles of Confederation, and most Americans prioritized their state over the nation. Nationalists led by George Washington, Alexander Hamilton, and James Madison had Congress call a constitutional convention in 1787. It produced the Constitution for a strong national government which was debated in every state and unanimously adopted. It went into effect in 1789 as the first modern constitutional liberal democracy based on the consent of the governed, with Washington as the first President.

Westward Expansion
In an 1858 speech, future President Abraham Lincoln alluded to a form of American civic nationalism originating from the tenets of the Declaration of Independence as a force for national unity in the United States, stating that it was a method for uniting diverse peoples of different ethnic ancestries into a common nationality:

American Civil War 
White Southerners increasingly felt alienated—they saw themselves as becoming second-class citizens as aggressive anti-slavery Northerners tried to end their ability to enslave people to the fast-growing western territories. They questioned whether their loyalty to the nation trumped their commitment to their state and their way of life since it was so intimately bound up with slavery and whether they could enslave people. A sense of Southern nationalism was starting to emerge; however, it was rudimentary as late as 1860 when the election of Lincoln was a signal for most of the slave states in the South to secede and form a new nation. The Confederate government insisted the nationalism was real and imposed increasing burdens on the population in the name of independence and nationalism. The fierce combat record of the Confederates demonstrates their commitment to the death for independence. The government and army refused to compromise and were militarily overwhelmed in 1865. By the 1890s, the white South felt vindicated through its belief in the newly constructed memory of the Lost Cause of the Confederacy. The North came to accept or at least tolerate racial segregation and disfranchisement of black voters in the South. The spirit of American nationalism had returned to Dixie.

The North's triumph in the American Civil War marked a significant transition in American national identity. The ratification of the Fourteenth Amendment settled the fundamental question of national identity, such as the criteria for becoming a citizen of the United States. Everyone born in the territorial boundaries of the United States or those areas and subject to its jurisdiction was an American citizen, regardless of ethnicity or social status (indigenous people on reservations became citizens in 1924, while indigenous people off reservations had always been citizens).

With a fast-growing industrial economy, immigrants were welcome from Europe, Canada, Mexico, and Cuba, and millions came. Becoming a full citizen was easy, requiring the completion of paperwork over five years.

However, new Asian arrivals were not welcome. The U.S. imposed restrictions on most Chinese immigrants in the 1880s and informal restrictions on most Japanese in 1907. By 1924, it was difficult for any Asian to enter the United States, but children born in the United States to Asian parents were full citizens. The restrictions were ended on the Chinese in the 1940s and on other Asians in 1965.

World Wars
After the United States entered World War I, nationalism surged. Americans enlisted in the military en masse, motivated by propaganda and war films. There was very little resistance to conscription.

World War II led to unprecedented nationalism in the United States. After the 1941 Attack on Pearl Harbor, many Americans enlisted in the military. During the war, much of American life centered on contributing to the war effort, mainly through volunteer efforts, entry into the labor force, rationing, price controls, and income saving. Citizens willingly accepted these sacrifices out of a sense of nationalism, feeling they were for the greater good. Even members of anti-war groups like the pacifist churches, anti-war movement, and conscientious objectors abandoned their pacifism for the sake of the war, feeling that World War II was a just war.

Cold War
Following World War II and beginning with the Cold War, the United States emerged as a world superpower and abandoned its traditional policy of isolationism in favor of interventionism. With this, nationalism took on a new form in the U.S., as Americans began to view their country as a world police with the ultimate goal of eradicating communism from the world. This nationalist fervor was fueled by US involvement in the Korean War, Vietnam War, Bay of Pigs Invasion, and many other conflicts.

Modern era
The September 11 attacks of 2001 led to a wave of nationalist expression in the United States. The start of the war on terror was accompanied by a rise in military enlistment that included not only lower-income Americans but also middle-class and upper-class citizens. This nationalism continued long into the War in Afghanistan and Iraq War.

Contemporary United States
Nationalism and Americanism remain topics in the modern United States. Political scientist Paul McCartney, for instance, argues that as a nation defined by a creed and sense of mission, Americans tend to equate their interests with those of humanity, which informs their global posture. In some instances, it may be considered a form of ethnocentrism and American exceptionalism.

Due to the distinctive circumstances involved throughout history in American politics, its nationalism has developed concerning loyalty to a set of liberal, universal political ideals and perceived accountability to propagate those principles globally. Acknowledging the conception of the United States as accountable for spreading liberal change and promoting democracy throughout the world's politics and governance has defined practically all of American foreign policy. Therefore, democracy promotion is not just another measure of foreign policy, but it is instead the fundamental characteristic of their national identity and political determination.

Varieties of American nationalism
In a 2016 paper in the American Sociological Review, "Varieties of American Popular Nationalism", sociologists Bart Bonikowski and Paul DiMaggio report on research findings supporting the existence of at least four kinds of American nationalists, including, groups which range from the smallest to the largest: (1) the disengaged, (2) creedal or civic nationalists, (3) ardent nationalists, and (4) restrictive nationalists.

Bonikowski and Dimaggio's analysis of these four groups found that ardent nationalists made up about 24% of their study, and they comprised the largest of the two groups Bonikowski and Dimaggio consider "extreme". Members of this group closely identified with the United States, were very proud of their country and strongly associated themselves with factors of national hubris. They felt that a "true American" must speak English and live in the U.S. for most of their life. Fewer, but 75%, believe that a "true American" must be a Christian, and 86% believe a "true American" must be born in the country. Further, ardent nationalists thought that Jews, Muslims, agnostics and naturalized citizens were something less than genuinely American. The second class, Bonikowski and DiMaggio considered "extreme", was the smallest of the four classes because its members comprised 17% of their respondents. The disengaged showed low pride in the government institutions, and they did not fully identify with the United States. Their lack of pride extended to American democracy, American history, political equality in the U.S., and the country's political influence. This group was the least nationalistic of all of the four groups which they identified.

The two remaining classes were less homogeneous in their responses than the ardent nationalists and disengaged were. Restrictive nationalists had low levels of pride in America and its institutions, but they defined a "true American" in ways that were markedly "exclusionary". This group was the largest of the four because its members comprised 38% of the study's respondents. While their levels of national identification and pride were moderate, they espoused beliefs that caused them to hold restrictive definitions of "true Americans"; for instance, their definitions excluded non-Christians."

The final group to be identified was creedal nationalists (also known as civic nationalists), whose members made up 22% of the study's respondents who were studied. This group believed in liberal values, was proud of the United States, and its members held the fewest restrictions on who could be considered a true American. They closely identified with their country, which they felt "very close" to, and were proud of its achievements. Bonikowski and Dimaggio dubbed the group "creedal" because their beliefs most closely approximated the precepts of what is widely considered the American creed.

As part of their findings, the authors report that the connection between big money, religious belief, and national identity is significant. The belief that being a Christian is an integral part of what it means to be a "true American" is the most significant factor which separates the creedal nationalists and the disengaged from the restrictive and ardent nationalists. They also determined that their groupings cut across partisan boundaries, and they also help to explain what they perceive is the recent success of populist, nativist, and racist rhetoric in American politics.

According to a 2021 American Journal of Sociology study by Bart Bonikowski, Yuval Feinstein, and Sean Bock, competing understandings of American nationhood had emerged in the United States in the prior two decades. They find, "nationalism has become sorted by party, as Republican identifiers have come to define America in more exclusionary and critical terms and Democrats have increasingly endorsed inclusive and positive conceptions of nationhood."

Cultural nationalism

Cultural nationalism has historically been an integral element of American nationalism. Such cultural nationalists form group allegiances based on a common cultural heritage rather than race or political party. This heritage may include culture (Culture of the United States), language (English language), religion (Christianity), history (History of the United States), ideology (Democracy), and symbols (National symbols of the United States). Cultural nationalism is distinct from ethnic nationalism, in which race and ethnicity are emphasized over culture and language.

Nationalism gained a cultural character beginning in the late 18th century. Multiple historical ideas have shaped modern cultural nationalism in the U.S., including the concept of the nation state, the fusion of nationalism and religion into religious nationalism, and identity politics.

Civic nationalism

American nationalism sometimes takes the form of Civic nationalism, a liberal form of nationalism based on values such as freedom, equality, and individual rights. Civic nationalists view nationhood as a political identity. They argue that liberal democratic principles and loyalty define a civic nation. Membership is open to every citizen, regardless of culture, ethnicity, or language, as long as they believe in these values.

Trumpism

President Donald Trump was described as a nationalist, and he embraced the term himself. Several officials within his administration, including former White House Chief Strategist Steve Bannon, Senior Advisor to the President Stephen Miller, Director of the National Trade Council Peter Navarro, former Deputy Assistant to the President Sebastian Gorka, Special Assistant to the President Julia Hahn, former Deputy Assistant to the President for Strategic Communications Michael Anton, Secretary of State Mike Pompeo, Secretary of Commerce Wilbur Ross, Trade Representative Robert Lighthizer, former acting Director of National Intelligence Richard Grenell, former National Security Advisor John R. Bolton and former National Security Advisor Michael Flynn were described as representing a "nationalist wing" within the federal government.

In a February 2017 article in The Atlantic, journalist Uri Friedman described "populist economic nationalist" as a new nationalist movement "modeled on the 'populism' of the 19th-century U.S. President Andrew Jackson" which was introduced in Trump's remarks to the Republican National Convention in a speech written by Stephen Miller and Steve Bannon. Miller had adopted Senator Jeff Sessions' form of "nation-state populism" while working as his aide. By September 2017, The Washington Post journalist Greg Sargent observed that "Trump's nationalism" as "defined" by Bannon, Breitbart, Miller and "the rest of the 'populist economic nationalist' contingent around Trump" was beginning to have wavering support among Trump voters. Some Republican members of Congress were also described as nationalists during the Trump era, such as Representative Steve King, Representative Matt Gaetz, Senator Tom Cotton and Senator Josh Hawley.

During the Trump era, commonly identified American nationalist political commentators included Ann Coulter, Michelle Malkin, Lou Dobbs, Alex Jones, Charlie Kirk, 
Laura Ingraham, Michael Savage, Tucker Carlson, and Mike Cernovich.

See also 

 American ancestry
 American conservatism
 American exceptionalism
 American literary nationalism
 American nativism
 American neo-nationalism
 American patriotism
 Americanism
 Americanization
 Christian Patriot
 Emergency Quota Act
 Immigration Act of 1924
 Liberal nationalism
 Manifest Destiny
 Melting Pot
 National symbols of the United States
 New Nationalism (Theodore Roosevelt)
 Paleoconservatism
 Patriot movement
 Propaganda in the United States
 Pax Americana
 Salad bowl (cultural idea)
 White nationalism

References 
Notes

Further reading 
 Arieli, Yehoshua (1964) Individualism and Nationalism in American Ideology. Cambridge, Massachusetts: Harvard University Press.
Birkin, Carol (2017) A Sovereign People: The Crises of the 1790s and the Birth of American Nationalism. Basic Books, .
 Faust, Drew G. (1988) The Creation of Confederate Nationalism: Ideology and Identity in the Civil War South. Baton Rouge, Louisiana: Louisiana State University Press.
 Kramer, Lloyd S. (2011) Nationalism in Europe and America: Politics, Cultures, and Identities Since 1775. Chapel Hill, North Carolina: University of North Carolina Press. 
 Lawson, Melinda (2002) Patriot Fires: Forging a New American Nationalism in the Civil War North. Lawrence, Kansas: University Press of Kansas.
 Li, Qiong, and Marilynn Brewer (2004) "What Does It Mean to Be an American? Patriotism, Nationalism, and American Identity After September 11." Political Psychology. v.25 n.5 pp. 727–39.
 
 Maguire, Susan E. (2016) "Brother Jonathan and John Bull build a nation: the transactional nature of American nationalism in the early nineteenth century." National Identities v.18 n.2 pp. 179–98.
 Mitchell, Lincoln A. (2016) The Democracy Promotion Paradox. Washington, D.C.: Brookings Institution. 
 Quigley, Paul (2012) Shifting Grounds: Nationalism and the American South, 1848-1865. New York: Oxford University Press. 
 Schildkraut, Deborah J. 2014. "Boundaries of American Identity: Evolving Understandings of “Us”." Annual Review of Political Science 
Staff (December 13, 2016) "How similar is America in 2016 to Germany in 1933". Boston Public Radio
 
 Trautsch, Jasper M. (September 2016) "The origins and nature of American nationalism," National Identities v.18 n.3 pp. 289–312.
 Trautsch, Jasper M. (2018) The Genesis of America; U.S. Foreign Policy and the Formation of National Identity, 1793 - 1815. Cambridge
 Waldstreicher, David (1997) In the Midst of Perpetual Fetes: The Making of American Nationalism, 1776–1820. Chapel Hill, North Carolina: University of North Carolina Press
 Zelinsky, Wilbur (1988) Nation into State: The Shifting Symbolic Foundations of American Nationalism. Chapel Hill: University of North Carolina Press.

External links

 
American culture
Political terminology of the United States